Abou Elkassim Britel is a citizen of Italy who is reported to have been transported through the United States' controversial extraordinary rendition program.
Abou was first apprehended in Pakistan, in February 2002, who handed him over to American authorities.
Abou was flown to Morocco in May 2002, and remains in extrajudicial detention there.

Abou joined with four other men, Bisher Al-Rawi, Binyam Mohamed, Ahmed Agiza and Mohamed Farag Ahmad Bashmilah, to sue the Jeppesen Dataplan a company with a contract with the US government to run the fleet of jets used in the extraordinary rendition program.
Marc Ambinder, commenting in the Atlantic magazine explained the United States President Barack Obama was opposing the men discovery, on the grounds doing so would expose techniques that would put the USA's national security at risk.

References

1967 births
Boeing
Extrajudicial prisoners of the United States
Living people
People subject to extraordinary rendition by the United States